True as a Turtle is a 1957 British comedy film directed by Wendy Toye and starring John Gregson, Cecil Parker, June Thorburn and Keith Michell.  In the film, a young couple embark on a voyage on a ketch named Turtle. John Coates wrote the screenplay, based on his novel of the same name.

The England maritime location for shooting was mainly the River Hamble. The yacht club shown is the Royal Lymington Yacht Club.

Cast
 John Gregson - Tony Hudson
 Cecil Parker - Dudley Partridge, the industrialist friend
 June Thorburn - Jane Hudson
 Keith Michell - Harry Bell
 Elvi Hale - Ann
 Avice Landone - Valeria Partridge

References

External links
 

1957 films
1957 comedy films
British comedy films
Films directed by Wendy Toye
Films shot at Pinewood Studios
Films based on British novels
Sailing films
1950s English-language films
1950s British films